Carral is a municipality of northwestern Spain in the province of A Coruña, in the autonomous community of Galicia. It is located 17 kilometers from the provincial capital of A Coruña. It has an area of 48 km², a population of 5453 (2004 estimate) and a population density of 113.6 people/km².

It borders with the municipalities of Ordes, Abegondo, Cambre, Cerceda and Culleredo.

References

External links
Weblog of Carral

 should be 43.2297N 8.3555W (GOOGLE EARTH)

Municipalities in the Province of A Coruña

zh:卡拉尔